Keith Coogan (born January 13, 1970) is an American actor. He is the grandson of actor Jackie Coogan.

Biography
Keith Eric Mitchell was born on January 13, 1970,  in Palm Springs, California, the son of Leslie Diane Coogan Mitchell, a realtor. He changed his name to "Keith Coogan" in 1986, two years after the death of his grandfather, Jackie Coogan.

As a child, he appeared on episodes of Little House on the Prairie, The Waltons, The Love Boat, Fantasy Island, Laverne & Shirley, Mork & Mindy, Eight Is Enough, Knight Rider, Growing Pains, Silver Spoons, Fame, and CHiPs.

In 1982, Coogan also appeared as 'William' in the adaptation of Ray Bradbury's All Summer in a Day that aired on the PBS series WonderWorks.

He has also starred in films including Adventures in Babysitting, Cousins, Hiding Out, Cheetah, Toy Soldiers, Book of Love, and Don't Tell Mom the Babysitter's Dead, and straight-to-video releases such as Python, Soulkeeper, and Downhill Willie. He guest-starred on Joan of Arcadia and Married to the Kellys.

His theater credits include John Olive's The Voice of the Prairie, James McLure's Pvt. Wars, and an unfinished Louisville work by Marsha Norman, The Holdup. All were performed at Timothy and Buck Busfield's "B" St. Theater in Sacramento, California, during the 1992 and 1993 seasons.

In 2008, he worked in Dallas, Texas, on a short film, The Keith Coogan Experience. On January 1, 2010, Coogan started the "Monologue a Day Project", where he learns a monologue or other short piece every day, "as inspired by Julie & Julia", and posts the resulting video performance on blogspot.com.

Coogan was featured in the minidocumentary, Simply Coogan – An Interview with Keith Coogan, released by Coogan on December 13, 2010, which coincided with his birthday celebrations.

Coogan hosted "The Call Sheet" on the SkidRowStudios.com radio podcast network, an entertainment industry-based show that also covered tech news and politics.

Selected filmography

References

External links

 
 
 Monologue a Day Project at blogspot.com

1970 births
20th-century American male actors
21st-century American male actors
American male child actors
American male film actors
American male television actors
American male voice actors
Living people
Male actors from Palm Springs, California